Nigel Bezani, known as Baz was a rugby union player who played prop for Pontypridd RFC in the Welsh Premier League.

Baz joined Pontypridd from Tylorstown RFC in the 1988/89 season, and captained Pontypridd to the SWALEC Cup win of 1996.

Baz retired from playing in 1997, and in 1999 returned to Pontypridd as Team Manager.

References

External links
Pontypridd RFC profile

Living people
Rugby union props
Pontypridd RFC players
Year of birth missing (living people)